The Division of Cook was an Australian Electoral Division in New South Wales. The division was created in 1906 and abolished in 1955. The Division was named for James Cook, who explored the east coast of Australia in 1770. It was located in the inner suburbs of Sydney, taking in the suburbs of Alexandria, Redfern and Surry Hills. It has been a safe seat for the Australian Labor Party, but in the 1930s and 1940s it was fiercely contested between Federal Labor and Lang Labor factions of the party.

Members

Election results

See also
 Division of Cook

Cook (1906-55)
Constituencies established in 1906
1906 establishments in Australia
Constituencies disestablished in 1955
1955 disestablishments in Australia